Jack Matthews may refer to:
Jack Matthews (rugby union) (1920–2012), Welsh rugby player
Jack Matthews (author) (1925–2013), American author
Jack Matthews, character in Our American Cousin
John H. Matthews (1888–1956), known as Jack, politician

See also
Jack Mathews (actor), alternative name of Canadian guitarist and actor Jack (J.D.) Nicholsen from the Leslie Spit Treeo
Jack Mathews (footballer) (1914–1994), Australian rules footballer
John Matthews (disambiguation)